Old Market & Serenity is one of the 19 constituencies in the Tai Po District.

The constituency returns one district councillor to the Tai Po District Council, with an election every four years. The seat has been currently held by Lau Yung-wai.

Old Market & Serenity constituency is loosely based on private apartments in Tai Po Old Market and Serenity Park with estimated population of 15,455.

Councillors represented

Election results

2010s

References 

Tai Po
Constituencies of Hong Kong
Constituencies of Tai Po District Council
1994 establishments in Hong Kong
Constituencies established in 1994